Maryland's Legislative District 30 is one of 47 districts in the state for the Maryland General Assembly. It covers part of Anne Arundel County, Maryland, it is home to Maryland's capital; the city of Annapolis. Until the 2010 census and subsequent redistricting, voters in this district selected three Delegates every four years to represent them in the Maryland House of Delegates.  Starting with the 2014 election, the district was divided into sub-districts 30A and 30B.

Demographic characteristics
As of the 2020 United States census, the district had a population of 124,623, of whom 99,393 (79.8%) were of voting age. The racial makeup of the district was 88,997 (71.4%) White, 14,596 (11.7%) African American, 566 (0.5%) Native American, 2,581 (2.1%) Asian, 57 (0.0%) Pacific Islander, 8,570 (6.9%) from some other race, and 9,265 (7.4%) from two or more races. Hispanic or Latino of any race were 15,170 (12.2%) of the population.

The district had 91,447 registered voters as of October 17, 2020, of whom 19,573 (21.4%) were registered as unaffiliated, 31,047 (34.0%) were registered as Republicans, 39,609 (43.3%) were registered as Democrats, and 629 (0.7%) were registered to other parties.

Political representation
The district is represented for the 2023–2027 legislative term in the State Senate by Sarah K. Elfreth (D) and in the House of Delegates by Shaneka T. Henson (D, District 30A), Dana C. Jones (D, District 30A) and Seth A. Howard (R, District 30B).

Past election results

References

Anne Arundel County, Maryland
30